The term Exeter Blitz refers to the air raids by the German Luftwaffe on the British city of Exeter, Devon, during the Second World War. The city was bombed in April and May 1942 as part of the so-called "Baedeker raids", in which targets were chosen for their cultural and historical, rather than their strategic or military, value.

Early raids
The first German air raid on Exeter took place on 7 August 1940, in the early stages of the Battle of Britain. A lone raider dropped a stick of five bombs on the St Thomas area of the town, causing little damage. The local paper reported one man was injured and a canary and several chickens were killed.  A further 18 raids were made against the city over the next 18 months, mostly hit-and-run raids by lone raiders. Exeter was little affected during the Blitz, the German night-bombing offensive against Britain's cities, though nearby Plymouth was severely damaged in early 1941.

This changed in 1942 when Exeter became the first target of the so-called "Baedeker Blitz", a campaign to attack targets of cultural and historical, rather than military or strategic, value. The raids took place in retaliation for the bombing of Lübeck by the RAF earlier that year.

April 1942
On the night of 23/24 April 1942, 49 bombers of KG2, KG106, led by the pathfinders of I/KG100 took part. However, due to heavy cloud most of the raiders missed their targets and little damage was done. Seven bombs fell on the St Thomas and Marsh Barton areas: 200houses were damaged and five people were killed, with eight injured. One raider, a Do 17, was shot down by an RAF night fighter, a Beaufighter from 604 Squadron.

The following night, 24/25 April, was clear, and two waves of 20bombers, most flying two sorties during the night, attacked again. In good visibility, and at low level in the absence of any AA defence, they hit the city, particularly the Pennsylvania area, killing 73 and injuring 54. Four raiders were shot down, three by night fighters and one over Portland by AA fire.
After this the Luftwaffe switched its attention elsewhere, attacking Bath, York and Norwich, before returning to Exeter in early May.

May 1942

On the night of 3/4 May 1942, just after midnight, 20 bombers arrived over the town centre, and in 70minutes devastated the town centre and Newtown area. Bombs fell in High St, Sidwell St and Fore St, starting fires in the houses and shops there, which were soon out of control. Fire brigade and emergency services struggled to tame the fires, under the threat of unexploded ordnance and despite strafing by German bombers. Reinforcements from the fire services at Torquay and Plymouth arrived to help; eventually 195appliances and 1,080personnel were employed to bring the fires under control, which was largely achieved by 5 May, though sporadic outbreaks continued until mid-day of 7 May. Around  of the city were devastated, 156people were killed and 583injured.

In the city centre, much of Bedford Circus, the top of High Street, and adjacent parts of Sidwell Street and Paris Street were destroyed. A second area at the top of Fore Street and much of South Street was also obliterated. Between these two areas,  the Cathedral was only hit by one high explosive bomb, which demolished St James's Chapel on its southern side. The City Library, with over a million documents and books was destroyed, as was the Vicars Choral College.

One bomb fell in Hoopern Fields close to the university Washington Singer laboratories, and the crater is still visible today.

In all 1,500 of the city's 20,000houses were obliterated and 2,700 badly damaged. Also 400shops, almost 150offices, 50warehouses and 36pubs were also destroyed.

Conclusion
Following the raid of 3/4 May 1942 German radio declared "Exeter is the jewel of the west; we have destroyed that jewel, and we will return to finish the job". Despite this boast, however, the May 1942 air raid was the last suffered by the city; Germany's Baedeker blitz continued in desultory fashion for the next two years, but became increasingly ineffective in the face of the RAF's growing night fighter defences.

In total, the nineteen air attacks on Exeter caused the death of 265 people and injuries to 687, of which 111 were serious. A large part of the city centre had been devastated, and it was some 20 years before repairs were fully completed, resulting in a completely new infrastructure.

References

Sources

Further reading

 
 
 
 
 

Blitz
World War II strategic bombing conducted by Germany
World War II aerial operations and battles of the Western European Theatre
1942 in England
The Blitz
1940s in Devon